Bhojpuri literature (Devanagari: भोजपुरी साहित्य; IAST: Bhojpurī Sāhitya) includes literature written in Bhojpuri language. Bhojpuri has developed over a course of 1300 years, the development of the language started in 7th century. The earliest form of Bhojpuri can be seen in the writings of Siddha Saints and Charyapada. Distinct literary traditions in Bhojpuri language date back to medieval periods when saints and bhakts of the region adapted a mixed language for their works.

Lorikayan, or the story of Veer Lorik, is a famous Bhojpuri folklore of Eastern Uttar Pradesh. Bhikhari Thakur's Bidesiya is another famous book.

The first Bhojpuri novel Bindiã was written in 1956 by Ram Nath Pandey. It was published by Bhojpuri Sansad, Jagatganj, Varanasi.

Ancient (7th to 11th century) 

The earliest mentions to Bhojpuri poets are found in Harshacharita by Bāṇabhaṭṭa, he has mentioned the names of Isanachandra and Benibharat, who were from Bhojpuri region and used to compose poems in vernacular instead of Sanskrit and Prakrit. Oldest form of Bhojpuri poetry can be seen in the Pran Sankali  of Nath Saint Chauranginath and in the poems of Charyapada.

Modern Periods
1947 to 1961: First Bhojpuri short story collection Jehal ke Sanadi (1948)  was published in this period. The first Bhojpuri novel Bindiã by Ram Nath Pandey also published in 1956.

Between 1961 and 1975: Nearly ten novels were published. Notable are 
Tharuhat ke babua aur bahuriya (1965), Jeevan Saah (1964), Semar ke phool (1966), Rahanidaar beti (1966), Ego subah ego saanjh (1967), Sunnar kaka (1976). Most of these are social drama while the first one is called a regional novel which elaborates life of Tharu tribal people.

After 1975: More than 30 novels have been written. Some notable of these are - Phulsunghi (1977), Bhor musukaail (1978), Ghar-tola-gaon (1979), Jinigi ke raah (1982), Darad ke dahar (1983), Achhoot (1986), mahendar Misisr (1994), Imiritiya Kaki (1997), Amangal hari  (1998), Awa lavati chalin ja (2000), Adhe aadh (2000) etc. of which Phulsunghi by Pandey kapil is one of the best novels written in Bhojpuri. Amangal hari  (1998) was written by Viveki Rai, a critic himself. Surma Sagun Bichare Na is a notable novel written by Ramesh Chandra Jha.

Purvi Ke Dhah, written by Jauhar Safiavadi, is the first Bhojpuri novel to be published by National Book Trust. It was launched by prominent Hindi critic Namvar Singh at Chhapra.

Notable works 

Here is list of some literary works in Bhojpuri Language:

Plays

 Beti Bechwa
 Bidesiya
 Devakshara Charita
 Gabarghichor
 Loha Singh
 Mehrarun ke Durdasa

Poems 

 Batohiya
 Achhut Kee Shiqayat

Books

 Badmash Darpan (Collection of Ghazals)
 Jehal ke Sanadi
 Veer Lorik (Folklore)

Prominent figures

 Gorakhnath is the one of the earliest poets of Bhojpuri.
 Kabir Das has written many Bhojpuri poems like Kauno Thagwa Nagaria Lootal Ho, Tohaar heera herail ba kichade me, and Ka leke aibu sasur ghare jaibu.
 Bhikhari Thakur is known as Shakespeare of Bhojpuri. He has written many Plays like Bidesiya, Gabarghichor, Beti Bechwa, Kaljug Prem, Bhai birodh etc.
 Heera Dom is credit as the creator of first printed work on Dalit Literature, which was the poem Achhut kee Shikayat printed in 'Saraswati' in 1914.
 Guru Govind Singh has written many works in Bhojpuri.
 Rahul Sankrityayan is also a notable person in Bhojpuri Literature.
 Acharya Shivpujan Sahay Hindi novelist known for Bhojpuri short story Kundan Singh-Kesar Bai.
 Manoj Bhawuk has written many books and been honoured with the Bhartiya Bhasha Parishad Award in 2006 for his Ghazal collection Tasveer zindagi ke. He has also written a history of Bhojpuri cinema.

References

External links
 Fictions: Literary Realism and the Crisis of Caste

Indian literature by language
Lit
Nepalese literature by language